Oocyte selection is a procedure that is performed prior to in vitro fertilization, in order to use oocytes with maximal chances of resulting in pregnancy. In contrast, embryo selection takes place after fertilization.


Techniques
Chromosomal evaluation may be performed. Embryos from rescued in vitro-matured metaphase II (IVM-MII) oocytes show significantly higher fertilization rates and more blastomeres per embryo compared with those from arrested metaphase I (MI) oocytes (58.5% vs. 43.9% and 5.7 vs. 5.0, respectively).

Also, morphological features of the oocyte that can be obtained by standard light or polarized light microscopy. However, there is no clear tendency in recent publications to a general increase in predictive value of morphological features. Suggested techniques include zona pellucida imaging, which can detect differences in birefringence between eggs, which is a predictor of compaction, blastulation and pregnancy.

Potentially, polar body biopsy may be used for molecular analysis, and can be used for preimplantation genetic screening.

References

Fertility
In vitro fertilisation
Female genital procedures
Cryobiology
Fertility medicine
Obstetrics
Human pregnancy
Reproduction